Dejan Kurbus (born 16 January 1993) is a Slovenian footballer who plays as a central defender for USV Gabersdorf.

References

External links

NZS profile 

1993 births
Living people
Slovenian footballers
Slovenia youth international footballers
Association football defenders
ND Mura 05 players
NK Zavrč players
Zamora CF footballers
NŠ Mura players
Slovenian PrvaLiga players
Segunda División B players
Slovenian Second League players
Slovenian expatriate footballers
Slovenian expatriate sportspeople in Spain
Expatriate footballers in Spain
Slovenian expatriate sportspeople in Austria
Expatriate footballers in Austria